Viktoriya Grigorova (born ) is a Bulgarian female volleyball player. She is part of the Bulgaria women's national volleyball team. On club level she played for Levski in 2014.

Television appearances 
2022 - participated in the fourth season of Desafio Bulgaria, where he finished in the honorable fifth

References

External links
 Profile at FIVB.org

1990 births
Living people
Bulgarian women's volleyball players
Place of birth missing (living people)
Middle blockers